Luca Pfeiffer (born 20 August 1996) is a German professional footballer who plays as a forward for  club VfB Stuttgart.

Career
In the 2019–20 season Pfeiffer contributed 15 goals as Würzburger Kickers were promoted to the 2. Bundesliga.

On 5 October 2020, the last day of the 2020 summer transfer window, Pfeiffer joined Danish Superliga champions FC Midtjylland on a deal until June 2024. The transfer fee paid to Würzburger Kickers was reported as €1.5 million.

In July 2021, Pfeiffer joined Darmstadt 98 on loan for the 2021–22 season.

On 2 August 2022, Pfeiffer joined VfB Stuttgart on a four-year contract.

References

External links
 
 
 

1996 births
Living people
People from Bad Mergentheim
Sportspeople from Stuttgart (region)
Footballers from Baden-Württemberg
German footballers
German expatriate footballers
Association football forwards
Stuttgarter Kickers players
VfL Osnabrück players
SC Paderborn 07 players
Würzburger Kickers players
FC Midtjylland players
SV Darmstadt 98 players
VfB Stuttgart players
3. Liga players
Regionalliga players
Danish Superliga players
German expatriate sportspeople in Denmark
Expatriate men's footballers in Denmark